Climatotherapy refers to temporary or permanent relocation of a patient to a region with a climate more favourable to recovery from or management of a condition. Examples include:
 The partial pressure of oxygen is lower at high altitude, so person with sickle cell disease might move to a lower altitude to reduce the number of sickle crises.
 Several sites around the world are advertised or studied as possibly of therapeutic benefit to patients with psoriasis, most notably the Dead Sea region.

See also
 Weather pains
 Meteoropathy
 Thalassotherapy

References 

Natural environment based therapies